Writing spider may refer to:

Argiope aurantia, also known as the "black and yellow garden spider" or "corn spider"
Other species of Argiope (spider)
Members of the genus Nephila, known as golden silk orb-weavers, sometimes misidentified as writing spiders

Set index articles on spiders